Roger Conley (born September 9, 1956) is an  American politician who served as a Delegate from the 10th district to the West Virginia House of Delegates from 2020 to 2022. Conley is a Republican.

Early life, education, and career
Conley was born in Parkersburg, West Virginia to Melvin and Maxine Conley. He was educated at West Virginia University at Parkersburg, a community college. Before running for office, Conley was employed in the manufacturing industry for 30 years, owning his own company for 12. Conley also served on the City Council of Vienna, West Virginia from 2016 to 2020.

Elections

2020
In a four-way primary, Conley was one of three Republicans to receive the nomination, with 25.39% of the vote.

In the general election, Conley was elected to the House of Delegates with the same two fellow Republicans, receiving 22.25% of the vote.

Tenure

Committee assignments
Government Organization
Veterans Affairs and Homeland Security
Workforce Development

Transgender rights
Conley supported a bill that would prohibit transgender athletes from competing on the team that aligns with their gender identity and was the sponsor of a similar bill.

Personal life
Conley is married to Katherine Conley and has three children. He is a Baptist.

References

Living people
1956 births
21st-century American politicians
Republican Party members of the West Virginia House of Delegates
Baptists from West Virginia
People from Parkersburg, West Virginia
West Virginia University at Parkersburg alumni